Bill Wallace (July 21, 1912 – May 17, 1993) was an American football player. He was drafted in the fourth round of the 1936 NFL Draft.

References

External links
 

1912 births
1993 deaths
People from El Campo, Texas
American football halfbacks
Rice Owls football players
College Football Hall of Fame inductees